Churchillian Drift is the term, coined by British writer Nigel Rees, which describes the widespread misattribution of quotes by obscure figures to more famous figures, usually of their time period. The term connotes the particular egregiousness of misattributions to British prime minister Winston Churchill.

Websites, as well as word of mouth, are responsible for repeating these misattributions, with the result that they are commonly believed. Former US Speaker of the House Paul Ryan, for example, has erroneously credited Churchill for the saying, "Americans will always do the right thing - after exhausting all the alternatives."

See also 

 Stigler's law of eponymy

References

Winston Churchill
Quotations